Stephen McConalogue (born 16 June 1981, Glasgow, Scotland) is a Scottish retired footballer who last played as a striker for Sutherland Sharks.

Career
McConalogue began his career with Dundee United and made his debut on the final day of the 1998–99 season, appearing as a substitute in the 2–1 home defeat to Celtic. The following season, McConalogue featured in just under twenty matches, starting in most of the final matches of the season, he scored a hat-trick in a 2000 League Cup tie at the start of the following season and immediately signed a new three-year contract, scoring his first league goal a month later. further goals materialised and McConalogue had a loan spell with Greenock Morton in the early part of 2001.

In November 2001, McConalogue's first appearance for United in just under a year saw him net a last-minute equaliser in a league match away to Dunfermline Athletic but after another dozen appearances that season, McConalogue spent the entire 2002–03 season on loan to Clyde, scoring five goals. Following the end of his loan spell, McConalogue was allowed to leave Tannadice at the end of his contract under new manager Ian McCall and returned to Clyde for another year, scoring seven times. In 2004, McConalogue had a six-month spell with St Johnstone before arriving at Partick Thistle in January 2005, going on to be one of the main parts of the Thistle side which won promotion back to the First Division via the play-off final in May 2006. After two-and-a-half years at Firhill, McConalogue left the club and joined Cowdenbeath in July 2007, and after having a successful loan spell with Stranraer in January 2008 and having mutually agreed his release from Central Park at the end of the 2007–08 season, returned to Stair Park in June 2008 to sign a one-year deal, where he picked up player of the year. McConalogue in 2009 moved to Australia and has since retired from football.

McConalogue has been capped by Scotland from under-15 to under-21 level and remains Scotland's highest capped schoolboy internationalist, also holding the record for goals scored.

Career statistics
After 21 June 2009

External links

References

1981 births
Living people
Footballers from Glasgow
Scottish footballers
Dundee United F.C. players
Greenock Morton F.C. players
Clyde F.C. players
St Johnstone F.C. players
Partick Thistle F.C. players
Cowdenbeath F.C. players
Stranraer F.C. players
Scottish Premier League players
Scottish Football League players
Association football forwards